Robert Constantin Filip (born 2 March 2002) is a Romanian professional footballer who plays as a central midfielder for Liga I club CFR Cluj.

Career
He made his senior debut for Alessandria on 4 September 2022, in a 1–0 Serie C loss over Imolese.

References

2002 births
Living people
Sportspeople from Piatra Neamț
Romanian emigrants to Italy
Romanian footballers
Association football midfielders
Serie C players
Serie D players
Liga I players
U.S. Alessandria Calcio 1912 players
CFR Cluj players
Romanian expatriate footballers
Romanian expatriate sportspeople in Italy
Expatriate footballers in Italy